St. Paul's Church, Carlton-in-the-Willows is a parish church in the Church of England in Carlton, Nottinghamshire. It is a Grade II listed building.

History

The church was commissioned by Henry Herbert, 4th Earl of Carnarvon. Unfortunately he died in 1890, just before the church was completed. His wife commissioned a cross in his memory which hangs in the church.

The church contains some Panelled oak stalls and desks carved by Eric Gill dating from 1903.

Organ

The church contains a pipe organ by E. Wragg & Son. A specification of the organ can be found on the National Pipe Organ Register.

References

Carlton
Churches completed in 1891
Carlton
Carlton
English churches with Norman architecture
Basilicas (Church of England)